Bünyamin Balcı (born 31 May 2000) is a Turkish football player who plays as a right-back for Süper Lig club Antalyaspor. Balcı also represents the Turkey national futsal team.

Career
Balcı signed his first professional contract with Antalyaspor on 26 November 2018. He made his professional debut with Antalyaspor in a 4-3 Turkish Cup win over Göztepe S.K. on 16 January 2020.

References

External links

 
 

2000 births
Living people
Sportspeople from Samsun
Turkish footballers
Turkey youth international footballers
Turkish men's futsal players
Antalyaspor footballers
Süper Lig players
Association football fullbacks